Rohn Taylor Stark (born May 4, 1959, Minneapolis, Minnesota, United States), who grew up in Fifty Lakes, Minnesota, is a former American football punter who played 16 seasons in the National Football League, 13 of those with the Baltimore / Indianapolis Colts. Stark was selected to four Pro Bowls in his stay with the Colts and then played in Super Bowl XXX as a member of the Pittsburgh Steelers.

Stark was the last player who played for the Colts prior to their relocation to Indianapolis to retire from the NFL. (Not counting John Elway, who spurned the Colts after they selected him number one overall in the 1983 NFL Draft before being traded to the Denver Broncos a week later.) Stark is also the only player who played for the Baltimore Colts to ever play against the Baltimore Ravens.

High school
in Pine River, Minnesota.  Rohan was Mr. Pine River High, starring in football, basketball and track (and even taking time out from track practice to pinch-hit for the baseball team).  In football, he played both defense and offense and handled the punting and place kicking duties.

Air Force Academy
After high school graduation, Stark headed for the Air Force Academy Preparatory School in Colorado Springs. He had always been interested in flying—his father, Bud Stark, is a TWA pilot—and had received a conditional appointment to the academy.  Eventually, Air Force doctors discovered that Stark has a slight curvature of the spine and could not fly in the US Air Force; it would be too dangerous for him to use an ejection seat. So, he returned home in January 1978.  What Stark didn't know was that his prep-school trigonometry professor and football coach, John Crowe, had sent game films of him to Florida State, where Crowe had been an All-America defensive back in 1958. Stark got a call from a Seminole coach in February. "I had barely heard of Florida State", he says, "but I went down and liked what I saw." He enrolled for the spring semester and competed in the high jump for FSU.

College career
From the official Florida State Seminoles website: "One of the greatest all-around athletes ever to wear the garnet and gold of Florida State, Stark starred as a punter and decathlete for the Seminoles. After his four-year career as FSU's punter was over, Stark had virtually every record including most career punts, highest season average (46.0) and highest career average (42.7). He earned first-team All-America honors in 1980 and 1981 and was a team captain as a senior."  At the end of his college football career, Stark was probably the best college punter since Ray Guy played for Southern Mississippi in the early '70s.  "The spring of his senior year, he cemented his spot as one of FSU's all-time greats, winning All-America honors as a decathlete as well.  In 1986, he was inducted into the Florida State Hall of Fame, in Football and Track/Field."  He seriously  considered participation in the 1984 Olympics.

Stark kicked left-footed. To returners, that means the ball is spinning the "wrong" way and is a little harder to handle; FSU opponents had fumbled about one of Stark's punts per game in his three-year career. And there was one more thing that scouts drooled over: Stark had never had a punt blocked.  In his 16 seasons in the NFL, he only had 7 blocked punts.

Retirement
After retiring from the NFL, Stark and his family made their home in Maui, where he works in real estate.

References

1959 births
Living people
Players of American football from Minneapolis
American football punters
Florida State Seminoles football players
All-American college football players
Baltimore Colts players
Indianapolis Colts players
Pittsburgh Steelers players
Carolina Panthers players
Seattle Seahawks players
American Conference Pro Bowl players